Berhampore College (So renamed in 1975), popularly known as Commerce College, was established in 1963, initially as Raja Krishnath College of Commerce to cater commerce education to students of Murshidabad in particular and the students of adjoining districts in general. Now it offers general degree courses in both arts and commerce. The college was originally affiliated with the University of Calcutta but in 1998 its affiliation changed to the University of Kalyani.

Departments

Arts 
Bengali
English
Sanskrit
History
Geography
Political Science
Philosophy
Economics
Commerce
Film Studies
Mathematics
Education

See also
List of institutions of higher education in West Bengal
Education in India
Education in West Bengal
Berhampore Girls' College

References

External links

University of Kalyani
University Grants Commission
National Assessment and Accreditation Council

Educational institutions established in 1963
Colleges affiliated to University of Kalyani
Universities and colleges in Murshidabad district
1963 establishments in West Bengal